The so-called Cogne case (known in Italian as Delitto di Cogne) involved the death of three-year-old Samuele Lorenzi. On 30 January 2002 while sleeping in his parents' bed in his family home in the mountain village of Montroz, hamlet of Cogne, in Aosta Valley, northern Italy. The cause of death was found to be a blow to the skull. The murder weapon has never been found.

In July 2004 an Italian court sentenced Samuele's mother Annamaria Franzoni to 30 years in prison for aggravated murder. However, on 27 April 2007 the Corte d'assise d'appello in Turin reduced Franzoni's penalty to 16 years of jail for homicide.

On 21 May 2008 the Corte di Cassazione confirmed the decision of the appeal court and Annamaria Franzoni was arrested.
On 17 September 2020, the Italian judges confirmed the immobiliar distraint of the house located in Montroz, to satisfy a professional credit of 245.000 euro for the attorney Carlo Taormina.

References

misteriditalia.com
crimine.net
 Roberto Pozzan. Cogne. L'intervista. Roma, Editori Riuniti, 2006. 
 Ilaria Cavo. La chiamavano Bimba. Milano, Arnoldo Mondadori Editore, 2007. 
 Annamaria Franzoni. La verità. Piemme, 2006. 
 Carmelo Lavorino. Cogne delitto infernale. Chi ha ucciso Samuele. Pironti, 2006. 
 Maria Grazia Torri. Cogne un enigma svelato., Giraldi, 2007. 
 Carlo Taormina La mia verita sul delitto di Cogne. con Il Giornale, 04 - 2007
 Gennaro De Stefano. L'uomo di Cogne Aliberti, 2008. 
 Elena Davoglio. Il Caso Cogne. Adnkronos Libri, 2003 
Pino Corrias. Nella villetta di Cogne, dove nessun ingranaggio fa una serratura, in Luoghi comuni. Dal Vajont a Arcore, la geografia che ha cambiato l'Italia. Milano, Rizzoli, 2006. pp. 165–185. .

Murder in Italy
History of Aosta Valley
2002 murders in Italy